Darmstadt-Eberstadt station is a railway station in the Eberstadt district of the town of Darmstadt, located in Hesse, Germany. It was opened in 1846, but the station building was demolished in March 1966 and replaced by a simple entrance building.

References

Railway stations in Darmstadt
Railway stations in Germany opened in 1846